RIK 2 (Greek: ΡΙΚ 2) is a Cypriot television channel owned and operated by Cyprus Broadcasting Corporation. It was launched in 1992.

Content
Broadcasts are typically in the Greek language, or in foreign languages with Greek subtitles.

Children's programs and sports programs are shown, alongside news bulletins, the news in Turkish and English, a daily broadcast (BIZ / WE) in Greek and Turkish addressing issues of interest to both Turkish and Greek Cypriots, as well as cultural shows, European news, foreign series and films.

External links

Television channels in Cyprus
Television channels and stations established in 1992
Greek-language television stations